St Fergus is a village in the Buchan area of Aberdeenshire, Scotland. The Parish of St Fergus includes the remains of Inverugie Castle and Ravenscraig Castle. The church in the village was built in 1763. The church for this parish previously stood in the old kirkyard near the shore  to the east. This site on the St Fergus Links is still used as a burial ground. Prior to the change in site of the church the parish was known as Longley and at a still more remote period Inverugie.

History
The parish was transferred to Aberdeenshire in 1891. At that time it had a population of 1,527.

The beach area was classed as a risk during WW2 as a possible landing area for a German invasion. Several pillboxes and anti-tank blocks were placed along the coast. These formed part of the Rattray stop line. Anti-tank ditches are still visible today.  A minefield was laid on St Fergus links and Craigwan sands. On 30 November 1941, 11-year-old John Paul, 12-year-old James Reekie and Corporal Ronald Cumbley of the Royal Engineers were killed by a landmine. Two other soldiers were also injured. On 26 March 1946, Lance Corporal Reginald Wallis, age 26, and Corporal John Wood, age 23, of 11 Bomb Disposal company were killed whilst clearing landmines from the area. Corporal Wood stepped on the mine detonating it.

During mine clearing operations by 11th Company Bomb Disposal, a British Empire Medal was awarded to Sgt Robert Husband.  Sgt Husband assisted a platoon officer dealing with mines that had fallen down a cliff when rough weather caused a bank of sand to collapse.

The St Fergus Gas Terminal situated to the north of the village, began operating in 1977 and was officially opened on 9 May 1978.

Transportation 
The town is served by buses between Fraserburgh and Aberdeen (via Peterhead).

References

External links

Visit Peterhead Tourism Web Site
Information about St Fergus at Gazetteer for Scotland

Saint Fergus